There are two sites in Denmark presented as Hamlet's Grave (Hamlets Grav), the burial site of Amleth (Amlethus, Amlodi, Amblett), the  Jutish chieftain of historical legend on whom Hamlet, the hero of  Shakespeare's tragedy was based; one is in the grounds of Marienlyst Castle in Helsingør, the other is a Bronze Age tumulus in Ammelhede,  Randers Municipality, Jutland.

Marienlyst
 

In Helsingør, tradition since at least the late 18th century located "Hamlet's grave"  just north of what is now Højstrup halt. 
Touristic interest in visiting Hamlet's Grave arose in the 1850s. By that time, a stone obelisk marked Hamlet's Grave in the park of Marienlyst Castle ,  on an old fortification on the crest of a hill.

According to Jacob Riis, there were two stone obelisks erected (subsequently) at the spot, which were both eventually carried away by relic-seekers. Therefore, in 1879, 
J.S. Nathanson, who rented  Marienlyst castle and operated a luxury hotel there from 1859 to 1896, marked Hamlet's grave with a  large heap of stones. He would re-supply the stones regularly as they were carried away as relics by tourists.
Nathanson's display of Hamlet's grave for the benefit of "the credulous and sentimental" and the aggressive use of the name of Hamlet in the advertisement of Hotel Marienlyst was much criticized at the time.

A granite stone shaped like a sarcophagus was erected on the site in 1926, on the occasion of  Helsingør's 500-years anniversary. The relief on the stone was designed by Einar Utzon-Frank. At this point, no pretense was made to the effect that the site was in any way the historical burial-place of Hamlet. Postcards of the period identify the monument as Hamlets mindesten ("Hamlet's memorial stone"). 
At a later time, a bronze plaque was added to the stone reading
Einar Utzon-Frank, Hamlets Mindegrav, på Sarkofagen Symboler for mandlig Styrke og Jomfruelighed, 1926
"Einar Utzon-Frank, Hamlet's memorial grave, on the sarcophagus symbols of virile strength and of virginity, 1926"
This refers to the design of Utzon-Frank's relief, showing a lion-like creature on one side (for Hamlet) and a unicorn on the other (for Ophelia).

Ammelhede
Løye interpreted the toponym as  'Amleth's heath'. 
In the account of Saxo Grammaticus, Amlethus dies in battle against Wiglek and is indeed   buried on a plain in Jutland, which was afterwards named after him.

On 30 April,  published a sarcastic article which made the tongue-in-cheek suggestion that the people of Randers were free to exploit the theory and erect a stone to Hamlet on the mound in an attempt to draw away tourism from the much-criticized "fraudulent" monument in Marienlyst park.

The following year, on 3 September 1933, such a stone was indeed raised on the mound by the recently founded Randers tourist board, citing the support of  Jørgen Olrik, curator of the Danish folklore museum, and Hans Ellekilde, archivist of the Danish folklore collection.
The stone is inscribed with an alliterating poem:
 

Excavations in 1950 established that the burial mound in fact dates to the  Bronze Age.

See also
 List of tombs and mausoleums

References

Grave
Tourism in Denmark
Disputed tombs
Danish folklore
Amleth